WWFN-FM (100.1 MHz) is a radio station broadcasting a classic country music format. Licensed to Lake City, South Carolina, United States, the station serves the Florence area. The station is currently owned by Cumulus Media.

History
WGFG played beautiful music prior to the late 1980s, switching first to MOR and then to country music, at which time the station became WQTR "Q-100". The current letters were chosen when the station became an oldies station with the name "Fun 100". Over the years, WWFN has also played classic rock and CHR.

In January 2013, WWFN switched affiliations from ESPN Radio to CBS Sports Radio.

On March 19, 2021, WWFN changed their format from sports to classic country, branded as "Classic Country 100.1".

Previous logo

References

External links

WFN-FM
Cumulus Media radio stations
Classic country radio stations in the United States